Gluphisia crenata, the dusky marbled brown, is a moth of the family Notodontidae. The species was first described by Eugenius Johann Christoph Esper in 1785. It is found in Europe, east over parts of Russia and China up to Japan. It is also found in North America, where it was traditionally treated as a separate species, Gluphisia septentrionis.

The wingspan is 28–34 mm. The moth flies from April to August in two generations depending on the location.

The larvae feed on Populus species, such as P. nigra, P. balsamifera and P. tremula, but also on Salix purpurea.

Subspecies
Gluphisia crenata crenata
Gluphisia crenosa crenosa (Hubner, 1796)
Gluphisia crenata tristis Gaede, 1933 (China: Sichuan)
Gluphisia crenata meridionalis Kiriakoff, 1964 (China: Yunnan)

External links
 
Dusky marbled brown on UKMoths
 Taxonomy
Fauna Europaea
Lepiforum e.V.
Schmetterlinge-Deutschlands.de 

Notodontidae
Moths described in 1785
Moths of Asia
Moths of Europe
Moths of Japan
Taxa named by Eugenius Johann Christoph Esper